The Maratón de Buenos Aires is an annual marathon foot-race which takes place in Buenos Aires, Argentina, during the Southern Hemisphere's Spring, usually in October.

The 21st edition of the Buenos Aires Marathon started on October 9, 2005 at 7:30 at the 9 de Julio Avenue and Córdoba Avenue in the Recoleta neighbourhood, being the start also the ending point after the 42.195 kilometres (26 miles and 385 yards) of the classic race.

The course visited many important spots of the city, featuring Callao Avenue, the River Plate Stadium, Libertador Avenue, Palermo neighbourhood, Corrientes Avenue, passing by the famous Gardel's neighbourhood, then down to La Boca's Caminito, to return passing by Puerto Madero, Casa Rosada, and the city centre.

The 2005 edition had almost 3000 participants from Argentina and all over the world. Most of the foreign runners where from Peru, Ecuador and Chile, but there were also from other American and European countries. More than 6000 competitors completed the complete marathon distance at the 2009 edition, out of a field of over 12,000 runners.

The 2020 edition of the race was postponed to 2021 due to the coronavirus pandemic.

Winners
Key:

See also
 21K Buenos Aires
 Mar del Plata Marathon

References
General
 Competition results and statistics from ARRS
Specific

External links
 Official Buenos Aires Marathon Site

Recurring sporting events established in 1984
Marathons in Argentina
Marathon